Night and Day is the fifth studio album by English musician Joe Jackson, released in June 1982 by A&M Records. It reached the top five in both the United Kingdom and United States, Jackson's only studio album to do so in either country. The album has been certified gold in the UK and US, and achieved platinum status in Canada. It has sold over one million copies.

The album pays tribute to the wit and style of Cole Porter (and indirectly to New York City). The track "Real Men" pointed obliquely to the city's early-1980s gay culture.

"Steppin' Out" earned Grammy Award nominations for Record of the Year and Best Pop Vocal Performance, Male. It reached number 6 on both the UK and the US charts. "Breaking Us in Two" reached number 18 in the US and number 59 in the UK.

Reissues
In 1997, A&M released a digitally remastered CD manufactured in Europe. Not only were the tracks remastered, but "Another World" has an extra two bars in the intro. The crossfades for the songs were also re-created.

In 2003, A&M released a deluxe version of the album with a bonus disc consisting of live tracks, demos, and songs Jackson recorded for the 1984 film Mike's Murder.

Track listing

Original LP

2003 deluxe edition
In 2003, A&M released a remastered deluxe edition of Night and Day. All tracks were 96K/24-bit remastered from the original analog master tapes. This edition includes six demos, five tracks from Jackson's soundtrack to the film Mike's Murder and five tracks from the 1988 double live album Live 1980/86.

Disc one

Disc two

Personnel
Credits adapted from the liner notes of Night and Day.

Musicians
 Joe Jackson – arrangements, orchestration, piano, Fender Rhodes and Yamaha electric pianos, Hammond organ, GEM organ, Prophet-5 and Minimoog synthesisers, alto saxophone, vibes, lead vocals
 Graham Maby – bass, vocals, percussion
 Larry Tolfree – drums, timbales, percussion
 Sue Hadjopoulos – congas, bongos, timbales, orchestral bells, xylophone, miscellaneous percussion, flute, vocals
 Ricardo Torres – bongos, cowbell, claves on "Target" and "Cancer"
 Ed Roynesdal – violins on "Real Men" and "A Slow Song"
 Al Weisman – background vocals
 Grace Millan – background vocals
 Jack Waldman – synthesiser programming
 Ed Roynesdal – synthesiser programming

Technical
 Joe Jackson – production, mixing
 David Kershenbaum – production, mixing
 Michael Ewasko – engineering
 Ken Tracht – engineering assistance

Artwork
 Joe Jackson – art direction
 Philip Burke – artwork
 George Dubose – photography

Charts

Weekly charts

Year-end charts

Certifications

References

Bibliography

External links
 Night and Day album information at The Joe Jackson Archive

1982 albums
A&M Records albums
Albums produced by David Kershenbaum
Joe Jackson (musician) albums